The Malleco Viaduct is a railway bridge located in central Chile, passing over the Malleco River valley, south of Collipulli in the Araucania Region. It was opened by President José Manuel Balmaceda on October 26, 1890. At that time, it was the highest such bridge in the world. The Panamerican Highway passes right next to the viaduct. 

A popular myth claims that the bridge was designed by Gustave Eiffel. Eiffel made a bridge proposal, but it was rejected by the Chilean authorities. It was designed by Aurelio Lastarria and the construction of the bridge was awarded to Schneider et Cie. O Le Creusot, another French company. The bridge was declared a national monument in 1990.

References

Buildings and structures in La Araucanía Region
Bridges completed in 1890
Railway bridges in Chile
Historic Civil Engineering Landmarks
Viaducts
National Monuments of Chile
Transport in La Araucanía Region